All Our Reasons is a jazz album by drummer Billy Hart, released on ECM Records in 2012 as ECM 2248.

Reception

The AllMusic review by Thom Jurek states "All Our Reasons is wonderfully executed, and full of excellent tunes, nice improvisational turns, numerous surprises (many of them subtle), and a warm, lively sense of engagement throughout". The Guardian'''s John Fordham noted "It's an A-list lineup, but focused on making unique music rather than parading technicalities". Michael J. West wrote in JazzTimes that "nine sublime, ruminative tracks that are as stark and atmospheric as the cover photograph... All Our Reasons is a splendid recording".

Track listingAll compositions by Billy Hart, except where noted''
"Song for Balkis" - 12:53
"Ohnedaruth" (Iverson, based on "Giant Steps") - 6:05
"Tolli's Dance" - 5:31
"Nostalgia for the Impossible" (Iverson) - 5:53
"Duchess" - 6:33
"Nigeria" (Turner) - 7:54
"Wasteland" (Turner) - 7:12
"Old Wood" (Iverson) - 1:42
"Imke's March" - 5:48

Personnel
Billy Hart - drums
Mark Turner - tenor sax
Ethan Iverson - piano
Ben Street - double bass

References

2012 albums
Billy Hart albums
ECM Records albums
Albums produced by Manfred Eicher